Ealing station may refer to several railway stations in London:

 Ealing Broadway station on the Great Western Railway and the terminus for London Underground's Central and District lines
 Ealing Common tube station on the London Underground District line and Piccadilly line Uxbridge Branch
 North Ealing tube station on the London Underground Piccadilly Line Uxbridge Branch 
 South Ealing tube station on the London Underground Piccadilly Line Heathrow Branch
 West Ealing railway station on the Great Western Railway